Christian Garrison (February 14, 1942 – July 2, 2020) was an American writer and author of detective novels.

Biography
Garrison began his career teaching English and drama, then worked in the film industry. He published his first novel in 1973, titled Little Pieces Of The West Wind. He wrote four other novels throughout his career, with Paragon Man being his only one translated into French.

Christian Garrison died on July 2, 2020 in Winston-Salem, North Carolina at the age of 78.

Works
Little Pieces Of The West Wind (1973)
Flim and Flam and the Big Cheese (1975)
The Dream Eater (1978)
Snakedoctor (1980)
Paragon Man (1981)

References

1942 births
2020 deaths
Writers from Louisiana
American male writers
People from Monroe, Louisiana